Christos Lelekas (born 19 December 2003) is a Greek professional footballer who plays as a midfielder for Super League 2 club AEK Athens B.

References

2003 births
Living people
Super League Greece 2 players
AEK Athens F.C. B players
Association football midfielders
Greek footballers
Footballers from Heraklion